"Choucoune" is a 19th-century Haitian song composed by Michel Mauléart Monton with lyrics from a poem by Oswald Durand.  It was rewritten with English lyrics in the 20th century as "Yellow Bird". Exotica musician Arthur Lyman made the song a hit in 1961.

Choucoune
One of Oswald Durand's most famous works, the 1883 Choucoune is a lyrical poem that praises the beauty of a Haitian woman of that nickname.  Michel Mauléart Monton, an American-born pianist with a Haitian father and American mother composed music for the poem in 1893, appropriating some French and Caribbean fragments to create his tune. The song "Choucoune" was first performed in Port-au-Prince on 14 May 1893. It became a popular méringue lente (slow méringue) in Haiti, and was played prominently during the bicentennial celebrations in Port-au-Prince in 1949. Choucoune was recorded by "Katherine Dunham and her Ensemble" for the Decca album Afro-Caribbean Songs and Rhythms released in 1946 (with the title spelled as Choucounne), and was first recorded in Haiti by Emerante (Emy) de Pradines for her Voodoo - Authentic Music of Haiti album (Remington R-199-151) released in the US in 1953.

Another version of Choucoune was recorded by Puerto Rican singer Lolita Cuevas with famed Haitian guitarist and arranger Frantz Casseus and is featured on Smithsonian Folkways' album "Haiti Folk Songs" released in 1953. 

The song also appeared in the 1957 Calypso-exploitation film Calypso Heat Wave, performed by The Tarriers, sung by the group's lead singer, Alan Arkin.

Versions

Yellow Bird

The English rendering of "Choucoune", "Yellow Bird", first appeared on the album Calypso Holiday, a 1957 release by the Norman Luboff Choir, with Luboff having arranged the song in the calypso style that become popular in the English-speaking world in the mid-1950s. The lyrics for "Yellow Bird", by Alan and Marilyn Bergman, have no connection with the narrative of the Durand poem—other than the poem features the words "ti zwazo" (little bird) in its refrain, and so the original Haitian song is sometimes called "Ti Zwazo" or "Ti Zwezo". The song became a minor hit at number 70 on the Billboard Hot 100 for the Mills Brothers in 1959. Its most successful incarnation came in the summer of 1961 when the Arthur Lyman Group reached number four on the Billboard Hot 100 and number two on the newly formed Easy Listening chart with their Hawaiian-flavored instrumental version,  which bested a rival instrumental single release by Lawrence Welk (number 61).

Several versions of "Yellow Bird" were recorded and released in Jamaica around the late 1950s/1960s. Jamaican mento/calypso singers renditions include Lord Jellicoe (Hilary ILP-1040), Keith Stewart (WIRL 1031), Count Frank (WIRL 1058), Roy Fuller (Tiger 002/Dynamic 3312), Archie Lewis (Federal 213) and The Joy Makers (Somb, 1976).

"Yellow Bird" has also been recorded by Keely Smith, Roger Whitaker, Davy Graham, Roger Williams, Johnny Tillotson, The Brothers Four, Gary Crosby, Lawrence Welk, The Paragons and Paul Clayton. The song continues to be popularly associated with calypso and the Caribbean, and is often performed by steelpan bands—but some versions, such as Chris Isaak's from Baja Sessions, show a Hawaiian flavor. In 1970, Fairport Convention recorded the song for their album Live at the L.A. Troubadour.

Popular culture
Vivian Vance sang "Yellow Bird" on a two-part Here's Lucy episode, Lucy Goes Hawaiian, which aired February 15 and Feb. 22, 1971. Vance sang it in a high falsetto, with a calypso beat—dressed in yellow with feathers like a canary (including a long tail feather)—and perched on a swing decorated as a nest.

The 23 October 1989 broadcast of the CBS TV series Murphy Brown entitled Miles' Big Adventure ends with guest star Yeardley Smith serenading her unwilling object of desire Miles Silverberg with a snippet of "Yellow Bird".

A Portuguese percussion band plays the song in a Full House episode, The House Meets the House - Part 2 at Walt Disney World while Michelle Tanner dances.

The Wiggles sing this song on their Let's Eat album and DVD.

"To Bowl or Not To Bowl", an episode of The Looney Tunes Show that first aired on July 27, 2011, featured an uptempo, ska-like version of "Yellow Bird" during the Merrie Melodies song segment of the same name performed by Holland Greco.

The song appears in the 2012 Australian movie The Sapphires and on the soundtrack album.

In the Monty Python sketch "Spot The Loony", one of the characters is named "Miles Yellowbird, up high in banana tree". The name quotes the opening words of the Bergman lyrics.

The song "Why" from the Jonathan Larson musical Tick, Tick... Boom! includes a reference to this song, as Larson reminisces about singing it in a talent show at the Y when he was nine.

Radio Trinidad 730 AM Frequency band, sign on song used to be a Steel drum version of "Yellow Bird"

Don't Ever Love Me

Harry Belafonte had a 1957 single release entitled "Don't Ever Love Me" that set different English lyrics (written by Lord Burgess to Michel Mauleart Monton's setting for "Choucune"), initially the B-side of "Mama Look at Bubu" (number 11), "Don't Ever Love Me" itself entered the Billboard Hot 100 at number 90.
  The song can also be found on the CD album Harry Belafonte - All Time Greatest Hits Vol. I (track #2).

See also
Choucoune (poem)
Cabane Choucoune
Haïti Chérie
Music of Haiti
Yellow Bird (cocktail)

References

External links
Oswald Durand's Original Creole Poem and a Short History are available at Webster University's Haiti-archive.  Accessed 27 April 2009.

Haitian folk songs
1893 songs
1957 singles
1961 singles
Yellow Bird
Yellow Bird
Songs with lyrics by Alan Bergman
Songs with lyrics by Marilyn Bergman